Harmit Singh Malik (born 1973) is an Indian American evolutionary biologist who is a professor and associate director at the Fred Hutchinson Cancer Research Center. He was awarded the 2022 Genetics Society of America Edward Novitski Prize.

Early life and education 
Malik earned his bachelor's degree in chemical engineering at the Indian Institutes of Technology. He became interested in molecular biology after being taught by K. K. Rao and reading Richard Dawkins' The Selfish Gene. He moved to the University of Rochester for graduate studies, where he worked toward a doctorate in biology. His PhD research considered the evolutionary strategies of retrotransposable elements. In 1999, he moved to Seattle to join the Fred Hutchinson Cancer Research Center, where he worked under the supervision of Steven Henikoff.

Research and career 
Malik is interested in genetic conflict, the competition between genes and proteins with opposing function. This conflict drives evolutionary change. He is also interested in the evolutionary processes that determine how human bodies interact with viruses. For example, together with Lisa Kursel, Malik identified genes at the centre of conflict between cell types in Drosophila virilis. As these processes typically take place over very slow timescales, they are complicated and challenging to unravel. To understand the genetic conflicts that occur between different genomes – and different components of the same genomes – Malik turns to fossils. Viral fossils in animal genomes can be used to monitor intense episodes of gene adaption. Malik has expanded this research field, so-called paleovirology, developing the capabilities to describe the functional outcomes of molecular arms races.

Working with Steven Henikoff, Malik developed the concept of centromere-drive, a mechanism that explains the unusual genetic conflicts that arise during meiosis. Centromere-drive describes an evolutionary process in which centromeric repeats expand, which results in the recruitment of kinetochore proteins and segregation of the expanded centromere to the egg during female asymmetric meiosis.

As associate director at the Fred Hutchinson Cancer Research Center, Malik has worked on various initiatives to improve diversity, equity and inclusion. He was awarded the 2022 Genetics Society of America Edward Novitski Prize for his work on evolution and chromosome biology.

Awards and honors 
 2008 Presidential Early Career Award for Scientists and Engineers
 2009 Early Career Scientist of the Howard Hughes Medical Institute
 2010 Vilcek Prize for Creative Promise in Biomedical Science
 2011 Great Immigrants Recipient
 2013 Full Investigator at the Howard Hughes Medical Institute
 2017 Eli Lilly Prize in Microbiology
 2019 Elected member of the National Academy of Sciences
 2022 Genetics Society of America Edward Novitski Prize

Selected publications

References 

1973 births
Living people
Indian Institutes of Technology alumni
University of Rochester alumni
Indian emigrants to the United States
Evolutionary biologists
Fred Hutchinson Cancer Research Center people